France–Kazakhstan relations are the diplomatic relations between France and Kazakhstan. Both nations are members of the Organization for Security and Co-operation in Europe.

History
After the Dissolution of the Soviet Union, Kazakhstan became an independent nation in December 1991. France and Kazakhstan established diplomatic relations on 25 January 1992, with France becoming the first European nation to recognize Kazakhstan. In September 1993, French President François Mitterrand paid an official visit to Kazakhstan. In June 2008, both nations signed a strategic partnership agreement and in 2010, both nations created a joint presidential commission, establishing yearly visits by both heads of state and arranging for yearly consultations between ministers of foreign affairs of both nations, beginning in 2011.

In 2008, France transferred its embassy from the former capital of Almaty to the country's new capital of Astana. In 2010, the two countries created a Franco-Kazakh Presidential Commission, which takes the form of an annual meeting between the two Heads of State. The Alliance Française operates two centers in Kazakhstan, in Astana and in Almaty. In 2017, both nations celebrated 25 years of diplomatic relations.  That same year, France participated in the Expo 2017 being held in Astana.

In 2021, Kylian Mbappe scored his first hat-trick for France as the reigning world champions secured their place at next year's World Cup in Qatar in style by thrashing Kazakhstan 8-0.  Sadly Kazakhstan are just not very good at all.

High-level visits

Presidential visits from France to Kazakhstan
 President François Mitterrand (1993)
 President Nicolas Sarkozy (2009)
 President François Hollande (2014)

Presidential visits from Kazakhstan to France

 President Nursultan Nazarbayev (2008, 2011, 2012, 2013, 2015)

 President Kassym-Jomart Tokayev (2022)

Bilateral relations
Since 1992, both nations have signed several bilateral agreements such as a Treaty of Friendship, Understanding and Cooperation (1992); Agreement on Cultural Cooperation (1993) and an Agreement on direct air and train service for French military personnel and equipment traveling to and from Afghanistan and for the use of Shymkent airbase (2009).

Transport
There are direct flights between both nations with Air Astana.

Trade
In 2016, trade between France and Kazakhstan totaled €3 billion Euros. Kazakhstan is France's largest trading partner in Central Asia and France is Kazakhstan's sixth largest trading partner globally. France is Kazakhstan's third largest investor, and has invested nearly US$10 billion in the Kazakh economy. French multinational companies such as Alstom, Engie, Peugeot, Renault, Saint-Gobain, Total S.A. and Vicat, among others, operate in Kazakhstan.

List of French ambassadors to Kazakhstan  

 1992 1994 Bertrand Fessard de Foucault
 1994 1999 Alain Richard
 1999 2003 Serge Smessov
 2003 2006 Gerard Perrole
 2006 2009 Alain Cuanon
 2009 2013 Jean-Charles Bertonnet
 2013 2017 Francis Etienne
 2017 2020 Philippe Martinet
 2020 n. v. Didier Caness

Resident diplomatic missions
 France has an embassy in Nur-Sultan and a consulate-general in Almaty.
 Kazakhstan has an embassy in Paris.

See also  
 Foreign relations of France 
 Foreign relations of Kazakhstan

References 

 
Kazakhstan
Bilateral relations of Kazakhstan